Valentina is a feminine given name. It is a feminine form of the Roman name Valentinus, which is derived from the Latin word "valens" meaning "healthy, strong".

It is used in Italian, Greek, Russian, Ukrainian, Belarusian, Serbian, Croatian, Macedonian, Slovene, Romanian, Bulgarian, Portuguese and Spanish languages.

List of notable people

Valentina Acosta, Colombian actress
Valentina de Angelis (born 1989), American actress
Valentina Aniballi, Italian discus thrower
Valentina Arrighetti, Italian volleyball player
Valentina Artamonova (born 1960), Russian politician
Valentina Barron, Australian actress
Valentina Bastianelli, Italian cyclist
Valentina Battler, Russian poet
Valentina Bellè, Italian actress
Valentina Belotti, Italian mountain runner
Valentina Bergamaschi, Italian footballer
Valentina Blažević, Croatian handball player
Valentina Bonariva, Italian dancer
Valentina Boni, Italian footballer
Valentina Braconi, Italian field hockey player
Valentina Bronevich, Russian politician
Valentina Caniglia, American cinematographer
Valentina Carnelutti, Italian actress
Valentina Carretta, Italian cyclist
Valentina Cernoia, Italian footballer
Valentina Cervi, Italian actress
Valentina Chebotareva, Russian figure skating coach
Valentina Chepiga (born 1962), Ukrainian IFBB professional bodybuilder
Valentina Cortese (1923–2019), Italian film actress
Valentina Cușnir, Moldovan politician
Valentina De Poli, Italian journalist
Valentina Díaz, Chilean footballer
Valentina Dimitrieva, Russian farm worker
Valentina D'Urbano, Italian writer
Valentina Favazza, Italian voice actress
Valentina Ferrer, Argentine model
Valentina Figuera, Venezuelan model 
Valentina Fiorin, Italian volleyball player
Valentina Galiano, Argentine volleyball player
Valentina Gardellin, Italian basketball player
Valentina L. Garza, Cuban writer
Valentina Gestro de Pozzo, Argentine reporter
Valentina Giacinti, Italian footballer
Valentina Giovagnini (1980–2009), Italian singer
Valentina Gorinevskaya (1882 – 1953), Russian military surgeon
Valentina Grizodubova, Soviet pilot
Valentina Gunina, Russian chess grandmaster
Valentina Igoshina (born 1978), Russian pianist
Valentina Ivakhnenko, Russian tennis player
Valentina Ivashova, Soviet actress

Valentina Kevliyan, Bulgarian gymnast
Valentina Legkostupova, Russian singer
Valentina Lisitsa (born 1973), Ukrainian pianist
Valentina Lodovini, Italian actress
Valentina Malyavina, Russian actress
Valentina Marocchi, Italian diver
Valentina Massi, Italian pageant winner
Valentina Matos, Spanish figure skater
Valentina Matviyenko, Russian politician
Valentina Maureira, Chilean teen
Elizabeth Miklosi aka Valentina (born 1983), American professional wrestler
Valentina Moncada, Italian historian
Valentina Monetta (born 1975), Sammarinese singer
Valentina Moscatt, Italian judoka
Valentina Naforniță, Moldovan soprano
Valentina Nappi, Italian pornographic film actress
Valentina Picca, Italian cyclist
Valentina Pivnenko, Russian politician 
Valentina Polkhanova, Russian cyclist
Valentina Ponomaryova (singer), Russian singer
Valentina Ponomaryova, Soviet cosmonaut
Valentina Rodini, Italian rower
Valentina Safronova (1918 – 1943), Hero of the Soviet Union
Valentina Sampaio, Brazilian actress
Valentina Sanina-Schlee (1899–1989), Russian-American fashion designer
Valentina Scandolara, Italian bicycler
Valentina Serena, Italian volleyball player
Valentina Shevchenko (born 1988), Russian-Peruvian kickboxer and mixed martial artist
Valentina Stupina, pilot
Valentina Sturza, Moldovan activist
Valentina Sulpizio, Italian tennis player
Valentina Talyzina, Soviet actress
Valentina Tereshkova (born 1937), Soviet cosmonaut and first woman in space
Valentina Tirozzi, Italian volleyball player
Valentina Tolkunova (1946–2010), Soviet singer
Valentina Tronel, French child singer
Valentina Turisini, Italian sports shooter
Valentina Uccheddu, Italian long jumper
Valentina Vargas, Chilean actress
Valentina Vezzali, Italian fencer
Valentina Yegorova (born 1964), Russian long-distance runner
Valentina Zenere, Argentine actress
Valentina Zhuravleva, Russian writer
Valentina and others, Christian martyrs in Palestine c. 308 AD

Surname
Giovanni Valentina, Brazilian rower

See also 
Valentina (disambiguation)

References

Croatian feminine given names
Greek feminine given names
Italian feminine given names
Lithuanian feminine given names
Macedonian feminine given names
Romanian feminine given names
Russian feminine given names
Slovene feminine given names
Spanish feminine given names

is:Valentína
pl:Walentyna
sk:Valentína